This is a list of lighthouses in Sri Lanka. There are 14 active lighthouses in Sri Lanka. Most of the lighthouses in Sri Lanka are operated and maintained by the Sri Lanka Ports Authority (SLPA). However several are operated by the Sri Lanka Navy, while some are inactive.

History
Most of the lighthouses in Sri Lanka were built during the British rule of the country (then known as Ceylon). These were operated and maintained by the Imperial Lighthouse Service, however some lighthouses had keepers sent from Trinity House. After Sri Lanka gained independence the operation of the lighthouses was taken over by the Navy on a piecemeal basis with the completion of transfer by 1976. There are twenty five lighthouses in Sri Lanka, with sixteen of those being still active. Most of these lighthouses now fall under the control of Sri Lanka Ports Authority, whilst the remainder are under the control of the Sri Lanka Navy.
 
There are four international lighthouses, they are:
 Barberyn (Beruwala) Lighthouse
 Dondra Head Lighthouse
 Little Basses Reef Lighthouse
 Great Basses Reef Lighthouse

Lighthouses

See also
 Lists of lighthouses and lightvessels

References

External links

 

Sri Lanka
Lig
Lighthouses